Marcus Cocceius Nerva may refer to:

Marcus Cocceius Nerva (consul 36 BC), great-grandfather of the Roman emperor
Marcus Cocceius Nerva (jurist), grandfather of the Roman emperor
Marcus Cocceius Nerva, consul suffectus in 40 AD, father of the Roman emperor
Nerva, Roman emperor from 96 to 98